Sodium phosphide is the inorganic compound with the formula Na3P. It is a black solid. It is often described as Na+ salt of the P3− anion. Na3P is a source of the highly reactive phosphide anion. It should not be confused with sodium phosphate, Na3PO4.

In addition to Na3P, five other binary compositions of sodium and phosphorus are known: NaP, Na3P7, Na3P11, NaP7, and NaP15.

Structure and Properties 
The compound crystallizes in a hexagonal motif, often called the sodium arsenide structure. Like K3P, solid Na3P features pentacoordinate P centers.

Preparation
The first preparation of Na3P was first reported in the mid-19th century. French researcher, Alexandre Baudrimont prepared sodium phosphide by treating molten sodium with phosphorus pentachloride.
 8 Na(l)  +  PCl5  →  5 NaCl  +  Na3P

Many different routes to Na3P have been described. Due to its flammability and toxicity, Na3P (and related salts) is often prepared and used in situ. White phosphorus is reduced by sodium-potassium alloy:
 P4 + 12 Na  →  4 Na3P

Phosphorus reacts with sodium in an autoclave at 150 °C for 5 hours to produce Na3P.

Alternatively the reaction can be conducted at normal pressures but using a temperatures gradient to generate nonvolatile NaxP phases (x < 3) that then react further with sodium. In some cases, an electron-transfer agent, such as naphthalene, is used. In such applications, the naphthalene forms the soluble sodium naphthalenide, which reduces the phosphorus.

Uses
Sodium phosphide is a source of the highly reactive phosphide anion. The material is insoluble in all solvents but reacts as a slurry with acids and related electrophiles to give derivatives of the type PM3:
  Na3P  +  3 E+  →   E3P (E = H, Me3Si)
The trimethylsilyl derivative is volatile (b.p. 30-35 C @ 0.001 mm Hg) and soluble. It serves as a soluble equivalent to "P3−".

Indium phosphide, a semiconductor arises by treating in-situ generated "sodium phosphide" with indium(III) chloride in hot N,N’-dimethylformamide as solvent. In this process, the phosphide reagent is generated from sodium metal and white phosphorus, whereupon it immediately reacts with the indium salt:

 Na3P + InCl3 → InP + 3NaCl

Sodium phosphide is also employed commercially as a catalyst in conjunction with zinc phosphide and aluminium phosphide for polymer production. When Na3P is removed from the ternary catalyst polymerization of propylene and 4-methyl-1-pentene is not effective.

Precautions
Sodium phosphide is highly dangerous releasing toxic phosphine upon hydrolysis, a process that is so exothermic that fires result. The USDOT has forbidden the transportation of Na3P on aircraft and trains due to the potential fire and toxic hazards.

References

Phosphides
Sodium compounds